End of an Era (/Telos Epohis) is a Greek film released in 1994. The film directed by Antonis Kokkinos and stars Kostas Kazanas, Dimosthenis Papadopoulos, Giorgos Pyrpasopoulos, Despoina Kourti, Pegky Trikalioti, Vangelis Kazan and Despoina Tomazani. The film won five awards in Greek State Film Awards and the best film award in Greek Film Critics Association Awards.

Plot
Christos a high school student of the last class moves to Athens with his family in order to prepare better for his entry exams of university. He soon is accepted by a group of school students. He and his new friends live their youth through the era of great changes, at the end of 60s. The music, the theatre, the pirate radio and the love are the way out from the illiberal and conservative environment caused by Greek military junta. At the end of the decade the friends finishes the school and their routes separate.

Cast
Kostas Kazanas ..... Giorgos
Dimosthenis Papadopoulos ..... Christos Vamvakas
Giorgos Pyrpasopoulos ..... Pericles
Despoina Kourti ..... Lena
Pegky Trikalioti ..... Stella
Vangelis Kazan ..... Fotis Vamvakas
Despoina Tomazani ..... Maria Drosou

Awards

References

External links

Greek drama films
1994 films
1990s Greek-language films